The Men's 200m Freestyle event at the 2003 Pan American Games took place on August 11, 2003 (Day 11 of the Games).

Medalists

Records

Results

References
usaswimming 

Freestyle, 200m